The König Ludwig GmbH & Co. KG Schlossbrauerei Kaltenberg is a brewery in Fürstenfeldbruck, Upper Bavaria, Germany.  Their slogan, "Bier von königlicher Hoheit", or "Beer of royal highness", refers to the brewery's heritage which can be traced back through the Kingdom of Bavaria, long associated with beer and brewing.  The current proprietor, Prince Luitpold of the House of Wittelsbach, is the great-grandson of the last King of Bavaria, Ludwig III, and by extent a descendant of the original signatories of the 1516 Bavarian Purity Law, and Ludwig I, whose wedding celebration marked the first Oktoberfest.

History

The House of Wittelsbach is known to have owned a brewery by 1260. 32 years later, Rudolf I, Duke of Bavaria built Schloss Kaltenberg, which houses part of the brewery's facilities today. The brewery as it exists today was opened in 1870. 

In 1980, Marthabräu brewery in Fürstenfeldbruck was purchased, where the company administration is now located and where a large part of its production takes place. In 2001, Prince Luitpold entered into a 50/50 joint partnership with Warsteiner. A smaller brewery in Holzkirchen was also integrated into the company in 2007, and a joint-venture established with Postbrauerei in Thannhausen. 

As of 2004, production was up to 340,000 hectoliters annually, of which 100,000 are produced at the brewery's Schloss Kaltenberg facilities. Much of the international production takes place under licence in the United Kingdom, Sweden, India, Indonesia and Croatia under the Kaltenberg brand.

Beers
König Ludwig brand

 König Ludwig Weissbier Hell
 König Ludwig Weissbier Dunkel
 König Ludwig Weissbier Kristall
 König Ludwig Weissbier Leicht
 König Ludwig Weissbier Alkoholfrei
 König Ludwig Dunkel
 König Ludwig Hell

Kaltenberg brand

 Kaltenberg Spezial
 Kaltenberg Schloss-Keller Naturtrüb
 Kaltenberg 3,8
 Kaltenberg Leicht
 Kaltenberg Ritterbock
 Kaltenberg Pils (Croatia)
 Kaltenberg Royal Lager (India)
 Königliches Festtagsbier
 Prinzregent Luitpold Weizenbock

References

 
Article by Michael Jackson

External links

 

Beer and breweries in Bavaria
Breweries in Germany
Beer brands of Germany
Companies based in Bavaria